Ferdinand Jap A Joe (born 13 February 1981) is a Surinamese former professional footballer who played as a defender. He played for the Suriname national team from 2000 to 2009, making 26 appearances and scoring one goal.

International career 
Out of his 26 caps for Suriname, Jap A Joe made 12 appearances in FIFA World Cup qualification. His only goal for the national team came in a 3–1 win over Dominica on 9 August 2008.

International goals 
 Suriname score listed first, score column indicates score after the Jap A Joe goal.

Honours 
Robinhood

 SVB Hoofdklasse: 2004–05
 SVB Cup: 2000–01, 2005–06, 2006–07
 Suriname President's Cup: 2001

WBC
 SVB Cup: 2012–13
 Suriname President's Cup: 2009

References 

1981 births
Living people
Surinamese footballers
Association football defenders
S.V. Robinhood players
S.V. Walking Boyz Company players
SVB Eerste Divisie players
Suriname international footballers